CineStar is a cinema company based in Lübeck, Germany.

The company was founded in 1948, and is the largest cinema chain in Germany and Croatia.  it has 54 locations in Germany and 16 in Croatia; 13 multiplexes in Czech Republic; 7 in Bosnia and Herzegovina; 4 in Serbia; and 1 in Kosovo.

The CineStar Cubix am Alexanderplatz, styled CUBIX), is a multiplex on Alexanderplatz in Berlin which opened in November 2000. It has screened films for the Berlin International Film Festival (Berlinale) cinemas since 2007.

CineStar's multiplex in the Sony Center, Potsdamer Platz, Berlin, along with the adjoining IMAX theatre, was another venue for the Berlinale, before their closure at the end of 2019.

References

External links 
 Cinestar CUBIX
 Cinestar Bosnia and Herzegovina

Cinema chains in Germany
Cinema chains in Croatia
Cinema chains in the Czech Republic
Cinema chains in Serbia